Iván Cepeda Castro (born October 24, 1962) is a left-wing Colombian politician, human rights activist, and philosopher. He served as a member of the Chamber of Representatives from 2010 and 2014, and currently serves as a member of the Senate as a member of the Alternative Democratic Pole. He is the official spokesperson for the Movement of Victims of State Crimes (MOVICE), an organization born in 2003 to bring together the families of victims of crimes against humanity and organizations that work for human rights.

Early life and career 
Born in Bogota, Cepeda is the eldest son of left-wing activists Manuel Cepeda Vargas and Yira Castro. In 1965 at the age of 3, Cepeda and his family were forced into exile due to political repression, and during his early years lived in Prague. Following the Warsaw Pact invasion of Czechoslovakia, Cepeda's family would seek refuge in Havana, Cuba. Cepeda's family would later return to Colombia in 1970, but remained a target of political violence. On August 9, 1994, his father was murdered on the streets of Bogota by a paramilitary group.

At age 19, Cepeda migrated to Sofia, Bulgaria, where he studied philosophy at Sofia University. Cepeda returned to Colombia in 1987 as a critic of the Soviet model, which he considered authoritarian, and became involved in the presidential campaign of Bernardo Jaramillo Ossa. Jaramillo Ossa would later be assassinated in 1990.

Cepeda would later distance himself from the Colombian Communist Party, a party he was active in during his adolescence, and in 1990 would join the M-19 Alliance party. Following his father's assassination, he created the Manuel Cepeda Foundation together with his wife, Claudia Girón, to identify the perpetrator of crime.

Cepeda would later found the National Movement for Victims, made up of 17 organizations that sought justice for crimes that occurred during the armed conflict in the 1980s and 1990s. This led to increased violent threats against Cepeda, leading him to go into exile in France in 2000. While in France, he received a master's degree in human rights from the University of Lyon. He would later return to Colombia in 2003 to resume his work advocating for victims of state and paramilitary violence in Colombia.

Political career 
In 2009, Cepeda formally entered the realm of electoral politics, standing for the Chamber of Representatives in the 2010 legislative elections. He received over 35,000 votes and was elected to the body as a member of the socialist Alternative Democratic Pole. In 2014, Cepeda chose to run for Senate, receiving a total of 84,126 votes and getting elected. Cepeda would be reelected in 2018, winning 77,842 votes that cycle.

References 

1962 births
Living people
Colombian politicians
Colombian socialists
Colombian human rights activists
Alternative Democratic Pole politicians